Events in the year 1813 in India.

Incumbents
The Marquess of Hastings, Governor-General, 1813-22.

Events
National income - ₹16,193 million
 The East India Company's trading monopoly is abolished.
 The Anglican Bishopric of Calcutta is established, with Thomas Middleton serving as the first bishop.
 The Chowringhee Theatre is inaugurated in Colcatta.

Law
 The Charter Act of 1813 was passed in United Kingdom on the company rule in India.

References

 
India
Years of the 19th century in India